Frank Serrao (August 10, 1918 – May 6, 1991) was an American football coach. He served as the head football coach at Redlands University in Redlands, California from 1964 to 1983, compiling a record of 115–80–1. Serrao led his 1976 Redlands team to the title game of the NAIA Division II Football National Championship, losing to Joe Fusco's Westminster Titans.

Serrao attended Rutherford High School in Rutherford, New Jersey, where he played football as a fullback and linebacker and captained the 1936 team. Jim Blumenstock, who later played college football at Fordham University and professionally with the New York Giants of the National Football League (NFL), was a teammate of Serrao on Rutherford's football squad. Serrao also participated in track at Rutherford. He was the shot put champion of the North Jersey League for two years. After graduating from Rutherford, Serrao moved on to Bucknell University, lettering for two seasons on the Bucknell Bison football team and playing mostly as a fullback. He also lettered three times on the track team, competing in the shot put. Serrao graduated from Bucknell in 1941 and joined the Army Air Forces in July 1942, serving as a mechanic and reaching the rank of staff sergeant. 

Serrao earned a master's degree in physical education at New York University and then began his coaching career in 1948 at his alma mater, Rutherford High School, working as backfield coach under George Melinkovich. Serrao succeed Melinkovich as head coach in 1949 when Melinkovich left to become head football coach at Utah State University. Serrao also coached basketball and track at Rutherford. 

Serrao died on May 6, 1991, at St. Bernardine Medical Center in San Bernardino, California following complications from open-heart surgery performed two weeks prior.

Head coaching record

College football

References

1918 births
1991 deaths
American football fullbacks
American male shot putters
Bucknell Bison football players
Bucknell Bison men's track and field athletes
Redlands Bulldogs football coaches
High school football coaches in California
High school basketball coaches in New Jersey
High school football coaches in New Jersey
High school track and field coaches in the United States
New York University alumni
Rutherford High School (New Jersey) alumni
United States Army Air Forces personnel of World War II
United States Army Air Forces non-commissioned officers
People from Rutherford, New Jersey
Sportspeople from Bergen County, New Jersey
Coaches of American football from New Jersey
Players of American football from New Jersey
Basketball coaches from New Jersey
Track and field athletes from New Jersey